Coenocharopa yessabahensis is a species of very small air-breathing land snails, terrestrial pulmonate gastropod mollusks in the family Charopidae, superfamily Punctoidea. This species is endemic to Australia.

References

Gastropods of Australia
Coenocharopa
Gastropods described in 1990
Taxonomy articles created by Polbot